The 1869 Newfoundland general election was held in 1869 to elect members of the 10th General Assembly of Newfoundland in the Newfoundland Colony. 21 Anti-Confederates (A-C) were elected against 9 Confederates (Con), ending for a moment the debate over joining the Dominion of Canada.

Results by party

Elected members
 Twillingate-Fogo
 Charles Duder (A-C)
 Smith McKay (A-C)
 Bonavista Bay
 James L. Noonan (A-C)
 William M. Barnes (A-C)
 Francis Winton (A-C)
 Trinity Bay
 Stephen Rendell (Con)
 Thomas H. Ridley (Con)
 Alexander Graham (later in a by-election)
 Robert Alsop (A-C) (defeated after named to cabinet post in 1870)
 John H. Warren (later, in a by-election)
 Bay de Verde
 John Bemister (Con)
 James J. Rogerson (later, in a by-election)
 Carbonear
 John Rorke (Con)
 Harbour Grace
 John Munn (Con)
 William S. Green (Con)
 Brigus-Port de Grave
 James B. Woods (A-C)
 St. John's East
 William P. Walsh (A-C)
 James Jordan (A-C)
 Robert J. Parsons, senior (A-C)
 St. John's West
 Peter Brennan (A-C)
 Thomas Talbot (A-C)
 Maurice Fenelon (later in a by-election)
 Henry Renouf (A-C)
 Lewis Tessier (later, in a by-election)
 Harbour Main
 James I. Little (A-C)
 John Kennedy (A-C)
 Ferryland
 Thomas Glen (A-C)
 Thomas Badcock (or Battcock) (A-C)
 Placentia-St. Mary's
 Charles Fox Bennett (A-C) (Leader of the Anti-Confederates)
 Robert J. Parsons, junior (A-C)
 Henry Renouf (A-C)
 Burin
 Frederick Carter (Con) (Leader of the Confederates)
 Edward Evans (Con)
 Fortune Bay
 Thomas R. Bennett (A-C) (Speaker of the Assembly)
 Burgeo-LaPoile
 Prescott Emerson (Con)

References

1869
1869 elections in North America
1869 elections in Canada
Pre-Confederation Newfoundland
1869 in Newfoundland